The Awful Truth is a 1925 American silent drama film directed by Paul Powell and released by the Producers Distributing Corporation. It is based on a 1922 play, The Awful Truth, by Arthur Richman. Agnes Ayres stars in this silent film version of the play. It was remade in 1937 as the talkie The Awful Truth.

Plot
As described in a film magazine review, Lucy suspects her husband Norman of indiscretions of which he is not guilty and secures a divorce. However, she knows that Norman loves her and she loves him. One night he finds his bride on the fire escape in her night clothes with a wealthy old bachelor who is known to be infatuated with Lucy. He takes the scene as a shock, not waiting to learn the truth that she had taken refuge on the fire escape due to a fire. Lucy, unhappy, has been asked to marry Danny, a callow youth with a fortune. She becomes engaged to him, but his curious aunt determines to air the scandal surrounding the divorcee. Lucy thus must make it appear that nothing stands between her and Norman so that the aunt will not believe there was a scandal. She asks Norman to come to the winter resort where they are spending the months, and he comes out of curtesy. To carry out the plan they join as a team on the toboggan run. The toboggan upsets, sending both into the snow wrapped in each other's arms. The warm embrace shows Norman "the awful truth," that both had been faithful until the last in their marriage.

Cast

Preservation
A print of The Awful Truth survives in the UCLA Film and Television Archive.

References

External links
 
 
 
 
 Still with Warner Baxter and Agnes Ayres

1925 films
American silent feature films
American films based on plays
Films directed by Paul Powell (director)
American black-and-white films
Producers Distributing Corporation films
Silent American drama films
1925 drama films
1920s American films
Surviving American silent films